McCracken may refer to:

People
McCracken (surname), people with the surname McCracken

Places
McCracken County, Kentucky, a county located in western Kentucky, USA
McCracken, Kansas, a city in Rush County, Kansas, USA
McCracken, Missouri, an unincorporated community, USA
McCracken, Ohio, a road in Garfield Hts., Ohio, USA
McCracken, South Australia, a suburb of Victor Harbor, Australia

Other
McCracken County Public Schools, a school district in the Kentucky county
McCracken County High School, a school operated by the above district
USS McCracken (APA-198), a Haskell-class attack transport ship

See also
McCrackin (disambiguation)